Keyser Kill flows into Schoharie Creek near Breakabeen, New York .

References

Rivers of New York (state)
Rivers of Schoharie County, New York